Amanda Winn-Lee is an American semi-retired voice actress, ADR director and script writer who works mainly on anime dubs. She was the voice of Mimiru in .hack//SIGN, Rally Vincent in Gunsmith Cats, Yohko Mano in Devil Hunter Yohko, Momiji Kushinada in Blue Seed and was featured most notably as Rei Ayanami of Neon Genesis Evangelion fame. Aside from voice work she quite often handles production, ADR direction and the scripting of various projects for her dubbing company Gaijin Productions, LLC. She has also been credited as Amanda Winn, before she was married.

Career
She can be heard in the commentary for the Region 1 The End of Evangelion DVD along with fellow voice actors Taliesin Jaffe and husband/Gaijin co-owner Jaxon Lee.

Expanding on her anime work, Winn-Lee also provided the voice of Konoko, the protagonist of the Bungie video game Oni.

Winn-Lee served as ADR director, script writer and producer for the English versions of The End of Evangelion and Evangelion: Death and Rebirth. She also directed and performed leading roles in the English versions of Dead Leaves and the Read or Die OVA.

She had been working with ADV Films for years before she moved out to create Gaijin Productions.

It was suggested by Spike Spencer (her friend as well as fellow voice actor) at Nan Desu Kan 2007 that she was interested in reprising her role(s) in the upcoming Rebuild of Evangelion films.  However, in May 2009, North American anime distributor Funimation announced that the role of Rei for the first film Evangelion: 1.0 You Are (Not) Alone would be voiced by Brina Palencia, who is under contract to voice Rei Ayanami for the three remaining Evangelion "Rebuild" films. However, Winn-Lee returned to voice Rei for the 2021 Amazon release of the entire Rebuild series, including the new Evangelion: 3.0+1.0 Thrice Upon a Time.

Personal life
Amanda and Jason Lee's son, Nicholas "Noodle" Lee, was born in November 2004. Her son was soon discovered to have infant leukemia, requiring extensive treatment before he was one year old.  Amanda and Jason were not involved in any new projects for several years, because they were caring for their son. However, by November 2008, Nicholas has been cancer-free for three years, which is the benchmark for doctors that his odds of cancer recurrence are virtually non-existent. She wrote a book about these experiences in a memoir called The Noodle Chronicles: Everything I know About Cheating Death I Learned From My Kid, which was released as an e-book.

Dubbing roles

Anime dubbing

 .hack//Intermezzo – Mimiru
 .hack//SIGN – Mimiru
 .hack//Legend of the Twilight – Magi
 .hack//Unison – Mimiru
 Battle Angel – Gally / Alita (ADV Films dub)
 Blue Seed – Momiji Fujimiya, Kaede Kunikida
 Burn Up! – Reimi (debut role)
 Burn Up W, Burn Up Excess – Rio Kinezone
 Dead Leaves – Pandy 
 Devil Hunter Yohko – Yohko Mano, Ayako Mano
 Dragon Half – Princess Vina
 Ellcia – Crystel
 F3 – Hiroe Ogawa (Soft Cel dub, credited as Helen Bed)
 Fire Emblem – Elis
 Geneshaft – Mika Seido
 Ghost in the Shell: Stand Alone Complex – Kurutan
 Golden Boy – Girl A, producer
 Gunsmith Cats – Rally Vincent
 Marchen Awakens Romance – Gido
 Neon Genesis Evangelion – Rei Ayanami, Pen Pen, Yui Ikari (movies only)
 Persona 4: The Animation – Yukiko Amagi
 Persona 5: The Animation - Ichiko Ohya
 Plastic Little – Titaniva Mu Koshigaya
 Read or Die (OVA) – Nancy "Miss Deep" Makuhari 
 Spriggan – Flight Attendant
 Sukeban Deka – Saki Asamiya
 Super Atragon – Annette

Video game credits 
 .hack//Quarantine – Mimiru
 .hack//Outbreak – Mimiru
 BlazBlue: Cross Tag Battle – Yukiko Amagi
 Bravely Second: End Layer – Magnolia Arch
 Heavy Gear II – Pinter, O'Neill
 Oni – Konoko
 Persona series – Yukiko Amagi, Ichiko Ohya
 Revolution 60 – Crimson 09
 Saints Row: The Third – Additional Voices
 Silent Hill HD Collection - Heather Mason
 Saints Row IV – Additional Voices
 Star Trek: Elite Force II – Kleeya
 Tail Concerto – Alicia Pris
 Trauma Team – Maria Torres

Production staff

ADR director/voice direction
 A Silent Voice
 Battle Angel
 Blue Seed
 Burn Up Excess
 Burn Up W
 Dead Leaves
 Devil Hunter Yohko
 Ellica
 The End of Evangelion
 Evangelion: Death and Rebirth
 Fire Emblem
 Gunsmith Cats
 Neon Genesis Evangelion
 Plastic Little
 Read or Die

Script adaptation
 A Silent Voice
 Blue Seed
 Burn Up Excess
 Dead Leaves
 Ellica
 The End of Evangelion
 Evangelion: Death and Rebirth
 Project ARMS
 Read or Die

References

External links

 Amanda Winn: Meet the voice of AD Vision news article
Amanda Winn Lee's public Facebook page

Living people
Actresses from Houston
Actresses from Los Angeles
American television writers
American video game actresses
American voice actresses
American voice directors
American women screenwriters
American women television writers
Screenwriters from California
Screenwriters from Texas
Wesleyan University alumni
Writers from Houston
Writers from Los Angeles
Year of birth missing (living people)
20th-century American actresses
21st-century American actresses
20th-century American women writers
21st-century American women writers
20th-century American writers
21st-century American writers
American feminists